The Hunter Island Group Important Bird Area comprises several islands in the Hunter Island Group and Trefoil Island Group lying off the north-western coast of Tasmania, Australia.

Collectively, they have an area of 152 km2. They have been identified by BirdLife International as an Important Bird Area (IBA) because they support over 1% of the world populations of Cape Barren geese, short-tailed shearwaters, black-faced cormorants, sooty oystercatchers and Pacific gulls. The IBA also supports the critically endangered orange-bellied parrot on its migration route between Tasmania and mainland south-eastern Australia. Most of Tasmania's endemic bird species breed in the IBA.

Hunter Island Group

 Albatross Island, part of the Albatross Island and Black Pyramid Rock Important Bird Area
 Bears Island
 Bird Island
 Black Pyramid Rock, part of the Albatross Island and Black Pyramid Rock Important Bird Area
 Dugay Islet
 Edwards Islet
 Hunter Island
 Nares Rocks
 Penguin Islet
 South Black Rock
 Steep Island
 Stack Island
 Three Hummock Island

Trefoil Island Group

 Trefoil Island
 Little Trefoil Island
 Doughboy Island East
 Doughboy Island West
 Henderson Islets
 Harbour Islets
 Murkay Islets

References

Important Bird Areas of Tasmania
Islands of North West Tasmania
Bass Strait